Su Wanwen (born 1982-10-02 in Guangzhou, Guangdong) is a female Chinese foil fencer, who competed at the 2008 Summer Olympics coming 16th.

Major performances
2006 Asian Games - 2nd team
2007 World Cup Grand Prix Cuba - 2nd team
2008 Summer Olympics - 16th Place

See also
China at the 2008 Summer Olympics

References

1982 births
Living people
Chinese female fencers
Fencers at the 2008 Summer Olympics
Olympic fencers of China
Asian Games medalists in fencing
Fencers at the 2006 Asian Games
Asian Games silver medalists for China
Medalists at the 2006 Asian Games
Fencers from Guangzhou
21st-century Chinese women